CDXML is the XML analogue of the binary CDX  file type used by CambridgeSoft Corporation's ChemDraw chemical structure application. It is considered to be the preferred format for future development.

External links 
 , Documentation of File Specification

Chemical file formats